This is a list of the butterflies of China belonging to the family Nymphalidae and an index to the species articles. This forms part of the full list of butterflies of China. 1,159 species or subspecies of Nymphalidae are recorded from China.

Nymphalidae
genus: Abrota
Abrota ganga (Moore, 1857)
A. g. pratti Leech, 1891 Sichuan, Yunnan
A. g. formosana Fruhstorfer, 1909 Formosa
A. g. flavina Mell, 1923 Guangdong
A. g. riubaensis Yoshino, 1997 Shaanxi
genus: Acraea 
Acraea issoria (Hübner, 1819)
A. i. sordice  (Fruhstorfer, 1914)  Yunnan
Acraea terpsicore  (Linnaeus, 1758) 
genus: Acropolis
Acropolis thalia (Leech, 1891)
genus: Aemona
Aemona amathusia (Hewitson, 1867)
A. a. oberthueri (Stichel, 1906) West China
Aemona lena Atkinson, 1871 Yunnan
genus: Aglais
Aglais urticae (Linnaeus, 1758)
A. u. eximia (Sheljuzhko, 1919) Amur, Ussuri
A. u. stoetzneri (Kleinschmidt, 1929) Szechuan
A. u. kansuensis (Kleinschmidt, 1940) Northwest China
A. u. chinensis Leech, 1893 China
A. u. connexa (Butler, [1882]) South Ussuri
Aglais io (Linnaeus, 1758)
genus: Aldania
Aldania raddei (Bremer, 1861)
Aldania ilos Fruhstorfer, 1909 Northeast China
A. i. ilos Fruhstorfer, 1909 Amur, Ussuri
A. i. nise Sugiyama, 1993 West China
Aldania themis (Leech, 1890) China, Ussuri
A. t. themis (Leech, 1890) Hubei, Sichuan, Gansu, Shaanxi
A. t. muri (Eliot, 1969) North China
A. t. neotibetana (Huang, 1998) Tibet
Aldania thisbe (Ménétriés, 1859) Amur, Ussuri, Central China, Northeast China
A. t. obscurior (Oberthür, 1906) Szechwan, Fukien
A. t. dilutior (Oberthür, 1906) Yunnan
Aldania deliquata (Stichel, [1909])
A. d. tshetverikovi (Kurentzov, 1936) Amur, Ussuri
Aldania yunnana (Oberthür, 1906) Yunnan
Aldania imitans (Oberthür, 1897) Yunnan
genus: Algia
Algia fasciata (C. & R. Felder, 1860)
A. f. formosana (Matsumura, 1929) Formosa
genus: Amathuxidia
Amathuxidia morishitai Chou & Gu, 1994 Hainan
genus: Apatura
Apatura iris (Linnaeus, 1758)
A. i. bieti Oberthür, 1885 Tibet, West China, Central China
A. i. amurensis Stichel, [1909] Amur, Ussuri
Apatura ilia ([Schiffermüller], 1775)
A. i. praeclara Bollow, 1930 Amur, Ussuri
A. i. phaedra Leech, 1892
A. i. szechwanensis Le Moult, 1947
A. i. yunnana Mell, 1952 Yunnan
A. i. huapingensis Yoshino, 1998 Guanxi
Apatura metis Freyer, 1829
A. m. heijona Matsumura, 1928 Korea, Amur, Ussuri
Apatura laverna Leech, 1893
A. l. laverna Leech, 1893 Sichuan, Shaanxi
A. l. yunlingensis Yoshino, 1999 Yunnan
genus: Aphantopus
Aphantopus hyperantus (Linnaeus, 1758)
A. h. ocellana (Butler, 1882) Amur, Ussuri
A. h. bieti (Oberthür, 1884) Sichuan, North Yunnan
A. h. luti Evans, 1915 Tibet
A. h. abaensis Yoshino, 2003 Sichuan
Aphantopus maculosa (Leech, 1890)
Aphantopus arvensis (Oberthür, 1876) West China
A. a. arvensis (Oberthür, 1876) Central China
A. a. deqenensis Li,1995 Yunnan
genus: Araschnia
Araschnia prorsoides (Blanchard, 1871) West China
Araschnia levana (Linnaeus, 1758)
A. l. wladimiri Kardakov, 1928 Amur, Ussuri
Araschnia doris Leech, [1892] West China, Central China
Araschnia dohertyi Moore, [1899] China, Yunnan
Araschnia burejana (Bremer, 1861) Tibet, China, Amur
Araschnia davidis Poujade, 1885 Tibet, West China, Central China
Araschnia zhangi Chou, 1994 Jiangsu
Araschnia oreas Leech, [1892] Tibet, West China
genus: Argestina
Argestina phantasta Goltz, 1938 Yunnan
Argestina pomena (Evans, 1915)
A. p. shuana (Evans, 1915) Tibet
A. p. chiuna (Bailey, 1935) Tibet
Argestina inconstans (South, 1913) Tibet
Argestina irma Evans, 1923 Tibet
Argestina karta Riley, 1923Tibet
Argestina nitida Riley, 1923 Tibet
Argestina waltoni (Elwes, 1906) Tibet
genus: Argynnis
Argynnis paphia (Linnaeus, 1758)
A. p. neopaphia Fruhstorfer, 1907 Amur
A. p. megalegoria Fruhstorfer, 1907 Szechuan, Yunnan
A. p. argyrophontes Oberthür, 1923 Southwest China
Argynnis anadyomene C. & R. Felder, 1862
A. a. anadyomene C. & R. Felder, 1862 Central China
A. a. ella Bremer, 1864 Amur, Ussuri
Argynnis pandora ([Schiffermüller], 1775)
A. p. pasargades Fruhstorfer, 1908 Tian Shan
Argynnis hyperbius (Linnaeus, 1763) China
Argynnis laodice (Pallas, 1771)
A. l. fletcheri Watkins, 1924 Amur, Ussuri
A. l. rudra Moore, [1858] Yunnan
A. l. samana Fruhstorfer, 1907 West China
A. l. huochengice (Huang & Murayama, 1992) Xinjiang
Argynnis kuniga (Chou & Tong, 1994) Zhejiang
Argynnis ruslana Motschulsky, 1866
A. r. ruslana Motschulsky, 1866 East China Amur, Ussuri
Argynnis sagana Doubleday, [1847]
A. s. sagana Doubleday, [1847] Northeast China
Argynnis childreni Gray, 1831 West China, Central China
A. c. childreni Gray, 1831 West China, Central China
Argynnis zenobia Leech, 1890
A. z. zenobia Leech, 1890 China, Tibet
A. z. penelope Staudinger, [1892] Ussuri
genus: Ariadne
Ariadne ariadne (Linnaeus, 1763)
A. a. pallidior (Fruhstorfer, 1899) South China, Taiwan
A. a. atternus Moore Hainan
Ariadne merione (Cramer, [1777])
genus: Aulocera
Aulocera sybillina (Oberthür, 1890) West China, Tibet
Aulocera brahminoides Moore, [1896] Tibet
Aulocera magica (Oberthür, 1886) West China, Tibet
Aulocera merlina (Oberthür, 1890) Sichuan, Yunnan
A. m. pulcheristriata Huang, 2001 Tibet
Aulocera padma (Kollar, [1844]) West China
Aulocera loha Doherty, 1886 Yunnan, Tibet
Aulocera saraswati (Kollar, [1844])
A. s. chayuensis Huang, 2001 Chayu
Aulocera swaha (Kollar, [1844])
genus: Athyma
Athyma pravara Moore, [1858]
A. p. indosinica Fruhstorfer, 1906 South Yunnan
Athyma jina Moore, [1858]
A. j. jina Moore, [1858] Yunnan
A. j. sauteri (Fruhstorfer, 1913) Taiwan
A. j. jinoides (Moore, 1898) West China, Central China
A. j. huochengica Huang & Murayama, 1992 Xinjiang
Athyma perius (Linnaeus, 1758)
A. p. perius (Linnaeus, 1758) South Yunnan
Athyma asura Moore, [1858]
A. a. baelia (Fruhstorfer, 1908) Taiwan
A. a. elwesi (Leech, 1893) West China, Central China
Athyma ranga Moore, [1858]
A. r. obsolescens (Fruhstorfer, 1906) South Yunnan
Athyma eupolia (Murayama & Shimonoya, 1963) Taiwan
Athyma opalina (Kollar, [1844])
A. o. hirayamai Matsumura, 1935 Taiwan
A. o. constricta Alphéraky, 1889 West China, Central China
Athyma selenophora (Kollar, [1844])
A. s. leucophryne (Fruhstorfer, 1912) Hainan, Hong Kong
A. s. yui Huang, 1998 Tibet, Metok
A. s. laela (Fruhstorfer, 1908) Taiwan
A. s. latifascia (Talbot, 1936) South Yunnan
Athyma zeroca Moore, 1872
A. z. galaesus (Fruhstorfer, 1912) South Yunnan
A. z. hishikawai Yoshino, 2001 Guanxi, Guizhou
A. z. whitei  (Tytler, 1940) 
Athyma minensis Yoshino, 1997 Fujian
Athyma cama Moore, [1858]
A. c. zoroastres Butler, 1877 Formosa
Athyma nefte (Cramer, [1780])
A. n. asita Moore, 1858 South Yunnan
A. n. seitzi (Fruhstorfer, 1906) South China, Hong Kong
Athyma sulpitia (Cramer, [1779])
A. s. sulpitia (Cramer, [1779]) South China, Hong Kong
A. s. ningpoana C. & R. Felder, 1862 Ning-Po
A. s. tricula (Frusthorfer, 1908) Taiwan
Athyma fortuna Leech, 1889
A. f. diffusa Leech Central China
A. f. guangxiensis Wang, 1994 Guangxi
Athyma recurva Leech, 1893 West China, Tibet
Athyma disjuncta Leech, 1890 West China, Central China
Athyma orientalis Elwes, 1888 Tibet
Athyma punctata Leech, 1890
A. p. punctata Leech, 1890 West China, Tibet
A. p. zhejiangensis Tong, 1994 Zhejiang
genus: Auzakia
Auzakia danava (Moore, [1858]) Tibet, West China
A. d. danava (Moore, [1858]) West China, Yunnan, Tibet
A. d. leechi Moore, 1898 Southwest China, West China
A. d. luri (Yoshino, 1997) Fujian
genus: Bassarona 
Bassarona durga  (Moore, 1858)
Bassarona iva   (Moore, [1858]) 
genus: Bhagadatta
Bhagadatta austenia (Moore, 1872)
B. a. montana (Hall, 1923) South China
genus: Boeberia
Boeberia parmenio (Böber, 1809) Northeast China, Amur
genus: Boloria
Boloria napaea Hoffmannsegg, 1804
Boloria pales ([Schiffermüller], 1775)
B. p. palina (Fruhstorfer, 1904) Sichuan
B. p. eupales (Fruhstorfer, 1903) Tibet
B. p. sifanica (Grum-Grshimailo, 1891) Qinghai, Gansu
Boloria sipora (Moore, [1875])
B. s. generator (Staudinger, 1886) Tian Shan
Boloria aquilonaris (Stichel, 1908)
B. a. banghaasi Seitz, [1909] Amur
Boloria napaea Hoffmannsegg, 1804
genus: Brenthis
Brenthis ino (Rottemburg, 1775) North China
B. i. amurensis (Staudinger, 1887) Amur
B. i. maxima (Staudinger, 1887) Ussuri
B. i. trachalus (Fruhstorfer, 1917) Tian Shan
Brenthis hecate ([Schiffermüller], 1775)
B. h. alaica (Staudinger, 1886) Tian Shan
Brenthis daphne (Bergsträsser, 1780)
B. d. ochroleuca (Fruhstorfer, 1907) Tian Shan, Amur, Ussuri
genus: Calinaga
Calinaga lhatso Oberthür, 1893
C. l. lhatso Oberthür, 1893 Yunnan
C. l. senseiensis Yoshino, 1997 Shaanxi
Calinaga buddha Moore, 1857
C. b. brahma Butler, 1885 Yunnan
C. b. formosana Fruhstorfer, 1908 Formosa
C. b. lactoris Fruhstorfer, 1908 Chang-Yang
Calinaga buphonas Oberthür, 1920 Yunnan
Calinaga genestieri Oberthür, 1922 Yunnan
Calinaga cercyon de Nicéville China
Calinaga davidis Oberthür West China, Tibet
Calinaga sudassana Melvill, 1893
C. s. sudassana Melvill, 1893 South Yunnan
Calinaga funebris Oberthür, 1919
Calinaga aborica  Tytler, 1915 
genus: Callarge
Callarge sagitta (Leech, 1890) Yunnan
Callarge occidentalis Leech, 1890
genus: Callerebia
Callerebia baileyi South, 1913 Tibet
Callerebia polyphemus (Oberthür, 1877)
C. p. polyphemus (Oberthür, 1877) Sichuan
C. p. annadina Watkins, 1927 Yunnan
C. p. confusa Watkins, 1925 West China (Hubei, Hunan, Chongqing, Guizhou)
C. p. ricketti Watkins, 1925 Fujian, Zhejiang, Guangxi
Callerebia suroia Tytler, 1914 Yunnan, Sichuan
Callerebia tsirava (Evans, 1915) Tibet
Callerebia ulfi Huang, 2003 Yunnan
Callerebia hybrida Butler, 1880 
genus: Cethosia
Cethosia biblis (Drury, [1773])
C. b. biblis (Drury, [1773]) Southwest China
C. b. hainana Fruhstorfer, 1908 Hainan
C. b. phanaroia Fruhstorfer, 1912 Hong Kong
Cethosia cyane (Drury, [1773])
C. c. euanthes Fruhstorfer, 1912 Yunnan
genus: Chalinga
Chalinga elwesi (Oberthür, 1884) West China, Tibet
Chalinga pratti (Leech, 1890)
C. p. pratti (Leech, 1890) Central China, West China
C. p. eximia (Moltrecht, 1909) Ussuri
genus: Charaxes
Charaxes bernardus (Fabricius, 1793)
C. b. bernardus (Fabricius, 1793) China, Hong Kong
C. b. hierax C. & R. Felder, [1867] Yunnan
Charaxes kahruba (Moore, [1895]) Yunnan
Charaxes marmax Westwood, 1847
Charaxes aristogiton C. & R. Felder, [1867]
genus: Chazara
Chazara briseis (Linnaeus, 1764) Northwest China
C. b. meridionalis (Staudinger, 1886) Tian-Shan
Chazara heydenreichi (Lederer, 1853) Northwest China, Tian-Shan
Chazara enervata (Alphéraky, 1882) Tian-Shan
Chazara kaufmanni (Erschoff, 1874)
C. k. obscurior (Staudinger, 1887) Tian-Shan
Chazara staudingeri (Bang-Haas, 1882)
C. s. gultschensis Grum-Grshimailo, 1888 Tian-Shan
Chazara persephone (Hübner, [1805])
genus: Chersonesia
Chersonesia risa (Doubleday, [1848])
C. r. transiens (Martin, 1903) West China
genus: Chitoria
Chitoria sordida (Moore, [1866]) Southwest China
C. s. sordida (Moore, [1866]) Southwest China
Chitoria modesta (Oberthür, 1906) Yunnan
Chitoria naga (Tytler, 1915) Yunnan
Chitoria ulupi (Doherty, 1889)
C. u. dubernardi (Oberthür) West China, Yunnan
C. u. fulva Leech, 1891 Korea, East China, Sichuan
C. u. tong Yoshino, 1997 Guanxi
Chitoria chrysolora (Fruhstorfer, 1908)
C. c. eitschbergeri Yoshino, 1997 Guanxi
Chitoria fasciola (Leech, 1890) West China, Central China
Chitoria subcaerulea  (Leech, 1891)   China (Omei-Shan)
Chitoria pallas  (Leech, 1890)
Chitoria leei  Lang，2009 Hubei Province, Mt. Shennongjia
genus: Chonala
Chonala praeusta (Leech, 1890) West China, Central China
Chonala episcopalis (Oberthür, 1885) West China, Yunnan
Chonala masoni (Elwes, 1882)
Chonala houae  Lang, Li & Deng, 2017 China, Chongqing, Nanchuan
Chonala huertasae  Lang & Bozano, 2016 Yunnan, Gongshan
Chonala irene  Bozano & Della Bruna, 2006 China, Central Sichuan
Chonala laurae  Bozano, 1999 Chinan, Shaanxi
Chonala miyatai  (Koiwaya, 1996) Sichuan, China.
Chonala satoshii  Tamai & Aoki, 2007 Sichuan, China.
Chonala yunnana  (Li, 1994) Yunnan, Zhongdian
genus: Cirrochroa
Cirrochroa tyche C. & R. Felder, 1861
C. t. mithila Moore, 1872 Yunnan
C. t. lesseta Fruhstorfer, 1912 South China, Hainan, Hong Kong
genus: Clossiana
Clossiana selene ([Schiffermüller], 1775)
C. s. dilutior (Fixsen, 1887) Amur, Ussuri
Clossiana perryi (Butler, 1882) Amur, Ussuri
Clossiana erubescens (Staudinger, 1901)
C. e. tienschanica (Wagner, 1913) Tian-Shan
C. e. houri (Wyatt, 1961)
C. e. chotana (O. Bang-Haas, 1915) Kun Lun Mountains
Clossiana selenis (Eversmann, 1837)
C. s. sibirica (Erschoff, 1870)
C. s. chosensis (Matsumura, 1927) Ussuri
Clossiana angarensis (Erschoff, 1870)
C. a. hakutozana (Matsumura, 1927) Northeast China, Amur, Ussuri
C. o. oscarus (Matsumura, 1927) Amur
C. o. australis (Graeser, 1888) Amur, Ussuri
Clossiana freija (Thunberg, 1791)
C. f. freija (Thunberg, 1791) Amur, Ussuri
Clossiana thore (Hübner, [1803-1804])
C. t. hyperusia (Fruhstorfer, 1907) Amur, Ussuri
C. f. maritima (Kardakov, 1928) Amur, Ussuri
Clossiana dia (Linnaeus, 1767)
Clossiana gong (Oberthür, 1884) West China, Tibet
Clossiana titania (Esper, 1794)
C. t. staudingeri (Wnukowsky, 1929) Amur
Clossiana euphrosyne (Linnaeus, 1758)
C. e. orphana (Fruhstorfer, 1907) Amur, Ussur
C. e. orphanoides Huang & Murayama, 1992 Xinjiang
Clossiana tritonia (Böber, 1812)
C. t. amphilochus (Ménétriés, 1859) Amur, Ussuri
Clossiana iphigenia (Graeser, 1888)
C. i. iphigenia (Graeser, 1888) Northeast China, Amur, Ussuri
genus: Coelites
Coelites nothis Westwood, [1850]
C. n. hainanensis Gu, 1994 Hainan
genus: Coenonympha
Coenonympha pamphilus (Linnaeus, 1758)
Coenonympha tullia (Müller, 1764)
C. t. sibirica Davenport, 1941 Amur
Coenonympha hero (Linnaeus, 1761)
C. h. perseis Lederer, 1853
Coenonympha glycerion (Borkhausen, 1788)
C. g. iphicles Staudinger, 1892 Amur, Ussuri
Coenonympha mahometana Alphéraky, 1881 Tian Shan
Coenonympha oedippus (Fabricius, 1787)
C. o. magna Heyne, 1895 Amur, Ussuri
Coenonympha nolckeni Erschoff, 1874 Tian Shan
Coenonympha amaryllis (Stoll, [1782]) China, Amur, Ussuri
Coenonympha xinjiangensis Chou & Huang, 1994 Xinjiang
Coenonympha tydeus Leech, [1892] Tibet
Coenonympha sinica Alphéraky, 1888 China
Coenonympha semenovi Alphéraky, 1887 West China, Tibet
Coenonympha tyderes Leech
Coenonympha sunbecca Eversmann, 1843
Coenonympha arcania (Linnaeus, 1761)
genus: Cupha
Cupha erymanthis (Drury, [1773])
C. e. erymanthis (Drury, [1773]) South China, Hong Kong, Taiwan, Hainan
genus: Cyrestis
Cyrestis thyodamas Boisduval, 1846 West China
C. t. chinensis Martin
C. t. formosana Fruhstorfer
Cyrestis themire Honrath, [1884]
C. t. themire Honrath, [1884]
Cyrestis cocles (Fabricius, 1787)
C. c. cocles (Fabricius, 1787)
Cyrestis nivea (Zinken, 1831)
C. n. tonkiniana Fruhstorfer
genus: Danaus
Danaus genutia (Cramer, [1779])
D. g. genutia China
Danaus chrysippus (Linnaeus, 1758)
Danaus melanippus Cramer, 1777
Danaus plexippus (Linnaeus, 1758)
genus: Davidina
Davidina armandi Oberthür, 1879 Northeast China, Shansi
Davidina alticola Röber, [1907] Central China, Shensi
genus: Dichorragia
Dichorragia nesimachus (Doyère, [1840])
D. n. nesseus (Grose-Smith, 1893) West China
genus: Dilipa
Dilipa fenestra (Leech, 1891) East China
Dilipa morgiana (Westwood, [1850])
genus: Discophora
Discophora sondaica Boisduval, 1836
D. s. zal Westwood, 1851 Yunnan
D. s. tulliana Stichel South China
D. s. hainanensis Fruhstorfer, 1911 Hainan
Discophora timora Westwood, [1850]
D. t. timora Westwood, [1850]
genus: Doleschallia
Doleschallia bisaltide (Cramer, [1777])
D. b. continentalis Fruhstorfer, 1899 South Yunnan
genus: Dophla
Dophla evelina (Stoll, [1790])
D. e. annamita (Moore, 1879) Yunnan
D. e. gasvena (Fruhstorfer, 1913) South China, Hainan
genus: Elymnias
Elymnias nesaea (Linnaeus, 1764)
E. n. timandra Wallace, 1869 Yunnan
Elymnias hypermnestra (Linnaeus, 1763)
E. h. hainana Moore, 1878 Hainan
E. h. septentrionalis Zhou & Huang, 1994 Hubei, Guangxi
Elymnias vasudeva  Moore, 1857 
Elymnias malelas (Hewitson, 1863)
E. m. ivena Fruhstorfer, 1911 Yunnan
genus: Enispe
Enispe lunatus Leech, 1891 West China
Enispe cycnus  Westwood，1851 
Enispe euthymius  Doubleday，1845 
genus: Erebia
Erebia ligea (Linnaeus, 1758)
E. l. mienschanica Goltz, 1939 Shansi
Erebia ajanensis Ménétriés, 1857 North China
E. a. ajanensis Ménétriés, 1857 Amur
E. a. arsenjevi Kurentzov, 1950 Ussuri
Erebia aethiops (Esper, 1777)
E. a. isolata Goltz, 1939 Shansi
Erebia neriene (Böber, 1809)
E. n. alcmenides Sheljuzhko, 1919 Amur, Ussur
Erebia alcmena Grum-Grshimailo, 1891 West China, Tibet
Erebia embla (Thunberg, 1791)
E. e. succulenta Alphéraky, 1897 Amur, Ussuri
Erebia cyclopius (Eversmann, 1844)
E. c. aporia Schawerda, 1919Amur, Ussuri
E. c. sinopius Huang & Murayama, 1992 Xinjiang
Erebia wanga Bremer, 1864 Amur
Erebia edda Ménétriés, 1851 Ussuri
Erebia turanica Erschoff, [1877 Tian Shan
Erebia radians Staudinger, 1886 Tian Shan
Erebia sokolovi Lukhtanov, 1990Tian Shan
Erebia kalmuka Alphéraky, 1881 Tian Shan
Erebia sibo Alphéraky, 1881 Tian Shan
Erebia meta Staudinger, 1886
E. m. alexandra Staudinger, 1887Tian Shan
E. m. melanops Christoph, 1889 Tian Shan
Erebia discoidalis Kirby, 1837
E. d. yablonoica Warren, 1931 Amur
Erebia atramentaria Bang-Haas, 1927 China
Erebia alini (Bang-Haas, 1937) Manchuria
Erebia theano (Tauscher, 1806)
genus: Ethope
Ethope henrici (Holland, 1887) Hainan
Ethope noirei Janet, 1896 West China
genus: Eulaceura
Eulaceura osteria (Westwood, 1850)
genus: Euphydryas
Euphydryas maturna (Linnaeus, 1758)
E. m. staudingeri Wnukowsky, 1929 Northwest China
Euphydryas ichnea (Boisduval, [1833])
E i. ichnea (Boisduval, [1833]) Amur, Ussuri
Euphydryas aurinia (Rottemburg, 1775)
E. a. aurinia (Rottemburg, 1775) Northwest China
Euphydryas asiatica (Staudinger, 1881)
E. a. alexandrina (Staudinger, 1887) Tian Shan
E. a. narina (Oberthür, 1909) Tian Shan
Euphydryas sibirica (Staudinger, 1871)
E. s. eothena (Röber, 1926) Amur, Ussuri
E. s. davidi (Oberthür, 1881) North China
Euphydryas iduna (Dalman, 1816) 
genus: Euploea
Euploea mulciber (Cramer, [1777])
E. m. mulciber (Cramer, [1777]) South China
E. m. dufresne (Godart, [1824]) Formosa
E. m. barsine Fruhstorfer, 1904 Taiwan
Euploea phaenareta (Schaller, 1785)
E. p. juvia Fruhstorfer, 1908 Taiwan
Euploea midamus (Linnaeus, 1758)
E. m. midamus (Linnaeus, 1758) South China
Euploea eunice (Godart, 1819)
E. e. hobsoni (Butler, 1877) Formosa
E. e. coelestis (Fruhstorfer, 1902) Southeast China, Hainan
Euploea klugii Moore, [1858]
E. k. minorata (Moore, 1878) Hainan
E. k. burmeisteri (Moore, 1883) Southeast China, Hainan
Euploea radamanthus (Fabricius, 1793)
E. r. radamanthus (Fabricius, 1793)
Euploea leucostictos (Gmelin, [1790]) Formosa
Euploea tulliolus (Fabricius, 1793)
E. t. koxinga Fruhstorfer, 1908 South China, Taiwan
Euploea algea (Godart, 1819)
E. a. limborgii Moore, [1879]
Euploea core (Cramer, [1780])
E. c. amymone (Godart, 1819) South China, Hong Kong, Hainan
E. c. prunosa (Moore, 1883) South China
Euploea modesta Butler, 1866
E. m. deriopes Fruhstorfer, 1911 Hainan
Euploea camaralzeman Butler, 1866
E. c. formosana Matsumura, 1919 Formosa
Euploea sylvester (Fabricius, 1793)
genus: Euripus
Euripus nyctelius (Doubleday, 1845)
E. n. euploeoides C. & R. Felder, [1867] Yunnan
genus: Euthalia
Euthalia monina (Fabricius, 1787)
E. m. kesava (Moore, 1859) Yunnan
E. m. tudela Fruhstorfer, 1913 South China, Hainan
Euthalia eriphylae de Nicéville, 1891
Euthalia phemius (Doubleday, [1848])
E. p. phemius (Doubleday, [1848]) Yunnan
E. p. seitzi Fruhstorfer, 1913 South China, Hong Kong
Euthalia aconthea (Cramer, [1777])
E. a. aditha Fruhstorfer, 1913 South China, Hainan
E. a. kingtungensis Lee, 1962 Yunnnan
Euthalia anosia (Moore, [1858])
E. a. yao Yoshino, 1997 Guanxi
E. a. saitaphernes  Fruhstorfer, 1913 
Euthalia lubentina (Cramer, [1777])
E. l. lubentina (Cramer, [1777]) South China
Euthalia confucius (Westwood, 1850) West China, Tibet
E. c. sadona Tytler, 1940 Southeast Tibet, Southeast Yunnan
Euthalia franciae (Gray, 1846)
E. f. raja (C. & R. Felder, 1859) Yunnan
Euthalia irrubescens Grose-Smith, 1893 West China, Taiwan
Euthalia purchella Lee, 1979 Yunnan, Southeast Tibet
Euthalia kardama (Moore, 1859) West China, Central China
Euthalia khama Alphéraky, 1895
E. k. khama Alphéraky, 1895 Sichuan, Gansu, Hunan, East Yunnan
E. k. dubernardi Oberthür, 1907 Northwest Yunnan, South Sichuan
Euthalia kosempona Fruhstorfer, 1908 Taiwan
E. k. albescens Mell, 1928 Guangdong
Euthalia malapana Shirôzu & Chung, 1958 Formosa
Euthalia nara (Moore, 1859)
E. n. shania Evans, 1924 Yunnan
E. n. hainanana Gu, 1994 Hainan
E. n. colinsmithi Huang, 1999 Tibet
E. n. chayuana Huang, 2001 Tibet
Euthalia omeia Leech, 1891 West China
Euthalia bunzoi Sugiyama, 1996
E. b. bunzoi Sugiyama, 1996 Sichuan
E. b. tayiensis Yoshino, 1997 Sichuan (Tayi)
Euthalia patala (Kollar, [1844])
E. p. patala (Kollar, [1844]) Central China
Euthalia guangdongensis Wu, 1994 Guangdong
Euthalia perlella Chou & Wang, 1994 Sichuan
Euthalia pratti Leech, 1891
E. p. pratti Leech, 1891 China, Tibet
E. p. occidentalis Hall, 1930 Sichuan
Euthalia sahadeva (Moore, 1859)
E. s. narayana  Grose-Smith & Kirby, 1891 
E. s. yanagisawai Sugiyama, 1996 Yunnan, Sichuan
E. s. thawgawa  Tytler, 1940 
Euthalia strephon Grose-Smith, 1893 Sichuan
E. s. brevifasciata Chou & Gu, 1994 Hainan
E. s. zhaxidunzhui Huang, 1998 Tibet
Euthalia yasuyukii Yoshino, 1998 Guanxi
Euthalia telchinia (Ménétriés, 1857 Yunnan
Euthalia duda Staudinger, 1886 China, Tibet
E. d. sakota Fruhstorfer, 1913 Yunnan
Euthalia undosa Fruhstorfer, 1906 West China
Euthalia thibetana (Poujade, 1885)
E. t. thibetana (Poujade, 1885) West China,Tibet
E. t. uraiana Murayama & Shimonoya, 1963 Formosa
E. t. melli Yokochi, 1997 Guanxi, Guangdong
Euthalia kameii Koiwava, 1996 Shaanxi
Euthalia aristides Oberthür, 1907 Sichuan
E. a. kobayashii Yokochi, 2005 Zhejiang, Fujian
Euthalia formosana Fruhstorfer, 1908 Formosa
Euthalia tsangpoi Huang, 1999 Tibet
Euthalia alpherakyi Oberthür, 1907 West China, Tibet
E. a. monbeigi Oberthür, 1907 Yunnan
E. a. alpherakyi Oberthür, 1907 Sichuan, Guanxi
E. a. insulae Hall, 1930 Formosa
E. a. chayuensis Huang, 2001 Tibet
Euthalia staudingeri Leech, 1891
E. s. nujiangensis Huang, 2001 Yunnan
E. s. yunnana Oberthür, 1907 Southwest China
Euthalia heweni Huang, 2002 Yunnan
Euthalia mingyiae Huang, 2002 Yunnan
Euthalia hebe Leech, 1891
E. h. hebe Leech, 1891 China, Tibet
Euthalia pacifica Mell, 1934
E. p. pacifica Mell, 1934 Zhejiang
E. p. xilingensis Yoshino, 1997 Sichuan
Euthalia pulchella (Lee, 1979) Tibet
Euthalia pyrrha Leech, [1892]
E. p. pyrrha Leech, [1892] West China
E. p. daitoensis Matsumura, 1919 Formosa
Euthalia linpingensis Mell, 1935 Guangdong, Guizhou
Euthalia koharai Yokochi, 2005 Yunnan, Guangxi
Euthalia niepelti  Strand, 1916 
Euthalia alpheda (Godart, [1824])
Euthalia masumi  Yokochi, 2009  Guangxi, Dayao-shan
Euthalia hoa  Monastyrskii, 2005
Euthalia apex  Tsukada, 1991 
genus: Fabriciana
Fabriciana niobe (Linnaeus, 1758)
F. n. orientalis (Alphéraky, 1881) Tian-Shan
F. n. voraxides Reuss, 1921 Ussuri, Amur
Fabriciana adippe ([Schiffermüller], 1775)
F. a. tianschanica (Alphéraky, 1881) Tian-Shan
F. a. chrysodippe (Staudinger, 1892) Amur
F. a. chinensis Belter, 1931 Szechuan
Fabriciana coreana (Butler, 1882)
F. c. coreana (Butler, 1882) Amur, Ussuri, China
F. c. ornatissima (Leech, 1892) China
Fabriciana xipe (Grum-Grshimailo, 1891)
F. x. xipe (Grum-Grshimailo, 1891) Ussuri, China
F. x. rueckerti (Fruhstorfer, 1911) Amur
F. x. aglaiaeformis Watkins, 1924 Ussuri
Fabriciana nerippe (C. & R. Felder, 1862)
F. n. nerippe (C. & R. Felder, 1862) China, Tibet
F. n. mumon (Matsumura, 1929) Ussuri
F. n. nerippina (Fruhstorfer, 1907) Szechuan, Tibet
F. n. vorax (Butler, 1871) Shanghai
genus: Faunis
Faunis aerope (Leech, 1890)
F. a. aerope (Leech, 1890) Sichuan, Southeast Tibet
Faunis canens Hübner, [1826]
F. c. arcesilas Stichel, 1933 South Yunnan
Faunis eumeus (Drury, [1773])
F. e. eumeus (Drury, [1773]) South China, Hong Kong
genus: Helcyra
Helcyra hemina  Hewitson, 1864  
Helcyra superba Leech, 1890
H. s. superba Leech, 1890 Sichuan
H. s. takamukui Matsumura Taiwan
H. s. wiensis Yoshino, 1997 Zhejiang
Helcyra plesseni (Fruhstorfer, 1913) Taiwan
Helcyra subalba (Poujade, 1885) West China, Central China
H. s. subsplendens (Mell)
genus: Herona
Herona marathus Doubleday, [1848]
genus: Hestina
Hestina nama (Doubleday, 1844)
H. n. nama (Doubleday, 1844) Yunnan
H. n. melanoides Joicey & Talbot, 1921 Hainan
Hestina assimilis (Linnaeus, 1758)
H. a. assimilis (Linnaeus, 1758) South China
Hestina mena Moore, 1858 West China
Hestina persimilis (Westwood, [1850])
H. p. chinensis (Leech, 1890) West China
Hestina nicevillei (Moore, [1895])
H. n. ouvradi Riley, 1939 China Yunnan, Tibet
Hestina namoides de Nicéville, 1900 South China, Tibet
genus: Hipparchia
Hipparchia autonoe (Esper, 1783) Northwest China. Tibet
H. a. orchomenus (Fruhstorfer, 1911) Tian Shan
Hipparchia parisatis (Kollar, [1849])
H. p. xizangensis (Chou, 1994) Tibet
genus: Hypolimnas
Hypolimnas misippus (Linnaeus, 1764)
Hypolimnas bolina (Linnaeus, 1758)
Hypolimnas anomala (Wallace, 1869)
genus: Hyponephele
Hyponephele lycaon (Kühn, 1774) China
H. l. catalampra (Staudinger, 1895) Mongolia
Hyponephele pasimelas (Staudinger, 1886) Northeast China
Hyponephele przhewalskyi Dubatolov, Sergeev & Zhdanko, 1994 Tian-Shan
Hyponephele korshunovi Lukhtanov, 1994 Tian-Shan
Hyponephele murzini Dubatolov, 1989 Tian-Shan
Hyponephele hilaris (Staudinger, 1886)
H. h. pallida Samodurow, 2000 Tian-Shan
Hyponephele glasunovi (Grum-Grshimailo, 1893) Tian-Shan
Hyponephele naubidensis (Erschoff, 1874) Tian-Shan
Hyponephele germana (Staudinger, 1887) Tian-Shan
Hyponephele rueckbeili (Staudinger, 1887) Tian-Shan
Hyponephele interposita (Erschoff, 1874)
H. i. interposita(Erschoff, 1874) Northwest China
Hyponephele laeta (Staudinger, 1886) Tian-Shan
Hyponephele kirghisa (Alphéraky, 1881) Tian-Shan
Hyponephele sheljuzhkoi Samodurov & Tschikolovez, 1996 Tian-Shan
Hyponephele davendra (Moore, 1865)
Hyponephele lupina (Costa, 1836)
Hyponephele dysdora (Lederer, 1869)
genus: Idea
Idea leuconoe Erichson, 1834
I.l. clara (Butler, 1867) Formosa
genus: Ideopsis
Ideopsis similis (Linnaeus,1758)
I. s. similis (Linnaeus,1758) South China, Formosa
Ideopsis vulgaris (Butler,1874)
I.v. contigua (Talbot,1939) Hainan
genus: Issoria
Issoria lathonia (Linnaeus, 1758)
I. l. isaaea (Gray, 1846) Yunnan
I. l. isaeoides Reuss, 1925 Szetschuan
Issoria gemmata (Butler, 1881)Tibet
I. g. wui Huang, 1998 Southeast Tibet
Issoria baileyi (Huang, 1998) Southeast Tibet
Issoria eugenia (Eversmann, 1847)
I. e. rhea (Grum-Grshimailo, 1891) Tsingai, Gansu
I. e. genia (Fruhstorfer, 1903) Sichuan, Shaanxi
I. e. pulchella Huang, 2001 East Tibet
I. e. tibetana Huang, 1998 WestTibet
Issoria altissima (Elwes, 1882) South Tibet
genus: Junonia
Junonia orithya (Linnaeus, 1758
J. o. ocyale Hübner, [1819] Yunnan
J. o. hainanensis (Fruhstorfer, 1912) Hainan
Junonia hierta (Fabricius, 1798) West China, South China
J. h. hierta (Fabricius, 1798) Yunnan
Junonia iphita (Cramer, [1779]) West China, South China
J. i. iphita (Cramer, [1779]) South China
Junonia almana (Linnaeus, 1758)
J. a. almana (Linnaeus, 1758) type locality Canton, China
Junonia lemonias (Linnaeus, 1758)
J. l. lemonias (Linnaeus, 1758) type locality Canton, China
Junonia atlites (Linnaeus, 1763)
genus: Kallima
Kallima inachus (Boisduval, 1846)
K. i. chinensis Swinhoe, 1893 West China, Central China
K. i. formosana Fruhstorfer Taiwan
K. i. siamensis Fruhstorfer, 1912 South Yunnan
Kallima knyvetti  Nicéville, 1886 
genus: Karanasa
Karanasa talastauana Bang-Haas, 1927
K. t. talastauna Bang-Haas, 1927 Tian-Shan
K. t. arasana Avinoff & Sweadner, 1951 Tian-Shan
K. t. angrena Avinoff & Sweadner, 1951 Tian-Shan
Karanasa wilkinsi (Erschoff, 1884)
K. w. wilkinsi (Erschoff, 1884) Tian-Shan
Karanasa leechi (Grum-Grshimailo, 1890)
K. l. gregorii Avinoff & Sweadner, 1951 Xinjiang
Karanasa latifasciata (Grum-Grshimailo, 1902) Tian-Shan
Karanasa regeli (Alphéraky, 1881)
K. r. regeli (Alphéraky, 1881) Tian-Shan
Karanasa tancrei (Grum-Grshimailo, 1893) Tian-Shan
Karanasa pungeleri (A. Bang-Haas, 1910) Tian-Shan
Karanasa abramovi (Erschoff, 1884)
K. a. abramovi (Erschoff, 1884) Tian-Shan
Karanasa goergneri Eckweiler, 1990 Gansu
genus: Kirinia
Kirinia epimenides (Ménétriés, 1859) East China, Amur, Ussuri
Kirinia epaminondas (Staudinger, 1887) East China, Amur
Kirinia eversmanni (Eversmann, 1847)
genus: Lasiommata
Lasiommata maera (Linnaeus, 1758)
L. m. weiwuerica Huang & Murayama, 1992 Xinjiang
Lasiommata majuscula (Leech, [1892]) West China
Lasiommata minuscula (Oberthür, 1923) West China
Lasiommata kasumi Yoshino, 1995 Shaanxi
Lasiommata petropolitana (Fabricius, 1787) Northeast China
L. p. falcidia (Fruhstorfer, 1908) Amur
Lasiommata hefengana Chou & Zhang, 1994 Xinjiang
genus: Lasippa	
Lasippa heliodore  (Fabricius, 1787)
Lasippa viraja  (Moore, 1872)
genus: Lelecella
Lelecella limenitoides (Oberthür, 1890)
L. l. limenitoides (Oberthür, 1890) Sichuan
L. l. wangi Chou, 1994 Shaanxi, Henan
L. l. jinlinus (Yoshino, 1997) Shaanxi
genus: Lethe
Lethe europa (Fabricius, 1775)
L. e. gada Fruhstorfer, 1911 Yunnan
L. e. beroe (Cramer, [1775]) South China
Lethe rohria (Fabricius, 1787)
L. r. permagnis Fruhstorfer, 1911 South China
Lethe confusa Aurivillius, 1897
L. c. confusa Aurivillius, 1897 South China, Hainan, Yunnan, Southeast Tibet
L. c. apara Fruhstorfer, 1911 Hong Kong, Hainan
Lethe mekara (Moore, [1858]) China
L. m. crijnana Fruhstorfer, 1911 Yunnan
Lethe chandica (Moore, [1858])
L. c. chandica (Moore, [1858]) Yunnan
L. c. coelestis Leech, [1892] West China
Lethe insana (Kollar, [1844])
L. i. baucis Leech, 1891 West China, Central China stat. rev. now full species
Lethe kouleikouzana Yoshino, 2008 Yunnan (Gaolingonshan Mountains)
Lethe serbonis (Hewitson, 1876) West China
Lethe scanda (Moore, 1857) West China
Lethe vindhya (C. & R. Felder, 1859)
Lethe kansa (Moore, 1857)
L. k. vaga Fruhstorfer, 1911 Yunnan
Lethe sinorix (Hewitson, 1863)
Lethe latiaris (Hewitson, 1862)
L. l. lishadii Huang, 2002 Yunnan
Lethe verma (Kollar, [1844])
L. v. sintica Fruhstorfer, 1911 Yunnan
L. v. stenopa Fruhstorfer, 1908 South China, Hainan
L. v. satarnus Fruhstorfer, 1911 West China
Lethe siderea Marshall, 1881 West China
Lethe nicetella de Nicéville, 1887 Tibet
Lethe maitrya de Nicéville, 1881
L. m. metokana Huang, 1998 Tibet
L. m. lijiangensis Huang, 2001 Yunnan
Lethe jalaurida (de Nicéville, 1881)
L. j. elwesi (Moore, [1892]) West China
L. j. gelduba Fruhstorfer, 1911 Sichuan, Yunnan
Lethe bitaensis Yoshino, 1999 Yunnan, Tibet
Lethe violaceopicta (Poujade, 1884) West China (Sichuan, Guizhou)
Lethe gemina Leech, 1891 West China
Lethe armandina (Oberthür, 1881) West China
Lethe albolineata (Poujade, 1884) Yangtze
Lethe andersoni (Atkinson, 1871) West China
Lethe argentata (Leech, 1891) West China
Lethe ocellata (Poujade, 1885) Sichuan, Tibet
Lethe nigrifascia Leech, 1890 Hubei, Hunan, Henan, Shaanxi, Gansu, Sichuan
Lethe baoshana (Huang, Wu & Yuan, 2003) Yunnan
Lethe zhangi (Huang, Wu & Yuan, 2003) Sichuan
Lethe baileyi South, 1913 Yunnan, Tibet
Lethe neofasciata Lee, 1985 Yunnan
Lethe wui Huang, 1999 Tibet
Lethe lisuae (Huang, 2002) Yunnan
Lethe uemurai (Sugiyama, 1994)
Lethe bipupilla Chou & Zhao, 1994 Sichuan
Lethe butleri Leech, 1889
L. b. butleri Leech, 1889 Central China, West China
Lethe camilla Leech, 1891 West China
Lethe christophi Leech, 1891 Central China, West China
Lethe clarissa Murayama, 1982 West China, Szechwan
Lethe cybele Leech, 1894 West China, Tibet
Lethe cyrene Leech, 1890 West China
Lethe diana (Butler, 1866) East China, Ussuri
Lethe dura (Marshall, 1882)
L. d. moupiniensis (Poujade, 1884) West China stat. rev. now full species
Lethe gracilis (Oberthür, 1886) Tibet
Lethe hecate Leech, 1891 West China
L. h. haba Yoshino, 2008 Yunnan
Lethe helena Leech, 1891 West China
Lethe helle (Leech, 1891) West China
Lethe guansia Sugiyama, 1999 Guangxi, Guangdong
Lethe labyrinthea Leech, 1890 West China
Lethe lanaris Butler, 1877 West China
Lethe laodamia Leech, 1891 West China
Lethe luteofasciata (Poujade, 1884) China
Lethe manzorum (Poujade, 1884) West China
Lethe marginalis Motschulsky, 1860 East China
L. m. obscurofasciata Huang, 2002 Yunnan
L. m. maackii (Bremer, 1861) Amur, Ussuri
Lethe monilifera Oberthür, 1923 West China
Lethe oculatissima (Poujade, 1885) West China
Lethe privigna Leech, [1892] West China
Lethe procne (Leech, 1891) Yunnan, Sichuan
Lethe proxima Leech, [1892] West China
Lethe satyrina Butler, 1871 West China, Tibet
Lethe sicelides Grose-Smith, 1893 West China
Lethe sicelis (Hewitson, 1862) China
Lethe syrcis (Hewitson, 1863)
L. s. syrcis (Hewitson, 1863) China
Lethe titania Leech, 1891 West China
Lethe trimacula Leech, 1890 West China
Lethe umedai Koiwaya, 1998 Sichuan
L. u. umedai Koiwaya, 1998 Sichuan
L. u. albofasciata Huang, 2002 Yunnan
Lethe liae Huang, 2002 Yunnan
Lethe yantra Fruhstorfer, 1914
Lethe yunnana D'Abrera
Lethe sura (Doubleday, 1848)
Lethe moelleri Elwes 1887
Lethe vindhya (Felder and Felder, 1859)
Lethe baladeva (Moore, 1865)
Lethe mataja Fruhstorfer 1908
Lethe sidonis (Hewitson, 1863)
Lethe lanaris Butler 1877
Lethe laodamia Leech 1891
Lethe cyrene Leech 1890
Lethe visrava (Moore, [1866])
Lethe niitakana  (Matsumura, 1906)  Taiwan
Lethe goalpara  Moore, 1865 
Lethe bhairava  Moore, 1857 
Lethe gregoryi  Watkins, 1927 
Lethe shirozui  (Sugiyama, 1997)
Lethe kanjupkula  Tytler, 1914 
Lethe tingeda  Q. Zhai & Y.L. Zhang, 2011 China, Guangxi Province
Lethe hayashii  Koiwaya, 1993
genus: Lexias
Lexias cyanipardus (Butler, [1869])
L. c. cyanipardus (Butler, [1869]) Yunnan
L. c. grandis Yokochi, 1991 South Yunnan
Lexias albopunctata (Crowley, 1895)
L. a. albopunctata (Crowley, 1895) South China
Lexias pardalis (Moore, 1878)
L. p. pardalis (Moore, 1878) Hainan
L. p. eleanor (Fruhstorfer, 1898) South China
L. p. jadeitina (Fruhstorfer, 1913) Yunnan
Lexias dirtea (Fabricius, 1793)
L. d. khasiana (Swinhoe, 1890) Yunnan
L. d. agosthena (Fruhstorfer, 1914) South China, Kwangtung
L. d. bontouxi (Vitalis de Salvaza, 1924) Yunnan
Lexias acutipenna Chou & Li, 1994 Guangxi
genus: Libythea
Libythea celtis (Laicharting, [1782])
L. c. chinensis Fruhstorfer, 1909 West China
Libythea myrrha Godart, 1819
L. m. sanguinalis Fruhstorfer, 1898 South China
Libythea geoffroy Godart, [1824]
L. g. alompra Moore 1901 Hainan
genus: Limenitis
Limenitis populi (Linnaeus, 1758)
L. p. ussuriensis Staudinger, 1887 Northeast China, Amur, Ussuri
L. p. fruhstorferi Krulikowsky, 1909 Xinjiang
L. p. kingana Matsumura, 1939 Manchuria
L. p. szechwanica Murayama, 1981 Sichuan, Shaanxi, Henan
Limenitis albomaculata Leech, 1891 West China
Limenitis dubernardi Oberthür, 1903 West China
Limenitis ciocolatina Poujade, 1885 West China, Tibet
Limenitis camilla (Linnaeus, 1764) China
L. c. japonica Ménétriés, 1857 Amur, Ussuri
Limenitis sydyi Lederer, 1853
L. s. latefasciata Ménétriés, 1859 Northeast China, Amur, Ussuri
Limenitis cleophas Oberthür, 1893 West China, Tibet
Limenitis moltrechti Kardakov, 1928 Northeast China, Amur, Ussuri
Limenitis amphyssa Ménétriés, 1859
Limenitis doerriesi Staudinger, 1892 Northeast China, Ussuri
L. d. tongi Yoshino, 1997 Zhejiang
L. d. shennonjiaensis Yoshino, 2001 Hubei
Limenitis helmanni Lederer, 1853
L. h. duplicata Staudinger, 1892 Northeast China, Amur, Ussuri
Limenitis homeyeri Tancré, 1881
L. h. venata Leech, 1892 Sichuan, Shaanxi
L. h. meridionalis Hall, 1930 Yunnan
Limenitis misuji Sugiyama, 1994
L. m. misuji Sugiyama, 1994 Sichuan
L. m. wenpingae Huang, 2003 Yunnan
Limenitis rileyi Tytler, 1940
L. r. xizangana (Huang, 1998) Tibet
Limenitis tamaii  Koiwaya, 2007  Sichuan, Baoxing.
genus: Litinga
Litinga cottini (Oberthür, 1884)
L. c. cottini (Poujade, 1885) Ta Tsien Lu, West Sichuan, North Yunnan
L. c. zhon (Yoshino, 1998) Tibet
L. c. albata Watkins, 1927 Yunnan
L. c. berchmansi (Kotzsch, 1929) Kansu
L. c. sinensis (O. Bang-Haas, 1937) Kansu
L. c. arayai (Yoshino, 2003) North Sichuan
Litinga mimica (Poujade, 1885)
L. m. mimica (Poujade, 1885) Sichuan, North China, Central China
L. m. gaolingonensis (Yoshino, 1995) West Yunnan
L. m. meilius (Yoshino, 1997) North Yunnan
L. m. pe (Yoshino, 1997) North Yunnan
genus: Lopinga
Lopinga achine (Scopoli, 1763)
L. a. achinoides (Butler, 1878) Amur, Ussuri
L. a. catena (Leech, 1890) Central China
Lopinga deidamia (Eversmann, 1851)
L. d. erebina Butler, 1883 Amur, Ussuri
L. d. thyria (Fruhstorfer, 1909) Central China
Lopinga dumetorum (Oberthür, 1886) West China, Tibet
Lopinga nemorum (Oberthür, 1890) West China, Tibet
Lopinga eckweileri  Görgner, 1990  China, Sichuan, Nanping
Lopinga fulvescens (Alphéraky, 1889) China
Lopinga gerdae Nordström, 1934 China
Lopinga lehmanni (Forster, 1980) China
genus: Loxerebia
Loxerebia loczyi (Frivaldsky, 1885) Suchow
Loxerebia bocki (Oberthür, 1893) Szechuan
Loxerebia carola (Oberthür, 1893) Szechuan
Loxerebia innupta (South, 1913) Tibet
Loxerebia martyr Watkins, 1927 Szechuan
Loxerebia megalops (Alphéraky, 1895) Tibet
Loxerebia sylvicola (Oberthür, 1886) Szechuan
Loxerebia pratorum (Oberthür, 1886) China, Tibet
Loxerebia albipuncta (Leech, 1890)
L. a. albipuncta (Leech, 1890) Central China
L. a. sato Yoshino, 1997 Shaanxi
Loxerebia saxicola (Oberthür, 1876) Inner Mongolia, Gansu, Hebei, Beijing
Loxerebia pieli Huang & Wu, 2003 Jiangxi
Loxerebia yphthimoides (Oberthür, 1891) Yunnan
Loxerebia phyllis (Leech, 1891) China, Tibet
Loxerebia delavayi (Oberthür, 1891) Yunnan
Loxerebia ruricola (Leech, 1890)
L. r. ornata (Goltz, 1939) Yunnan
L. r. minorata (Goltz, 1939) Yunnan
Loxerebia seitzi (Goltz, 1939) Yunnan
Loxerebia rurigena (Leech, 1890) China, Tibet
Loxerebia yukikoae
L. y. yukikoae North Sichuan
L. y. sikunianensis Yoshino, 1997 Sichuan
genus: Mandarinia
Mandarinia regalis Leech, [1892]
M. r.  regalis West China, Central China
M. r. baronesa Fruhstorfer, 1906 South Yunnan
M. r. obliqua Zhao, 1994 Sichuan
Mandarinia uemurai  Sugiyama, 1993 
genus: Melanargia
Melanargia russiae (Esper, 1783) Tian Shan
Melanargia leda Leech, 1891 West China, Tibet
Melanargia halimede (Ménétriés, 1859) Northeast China
Melanargia lugens Honrath, 1888 Central China
Melanargia meridionalis C. & R. Felder, 1862 North China, West China
Melanargia epimede Staudinger, 1892 Northeast China
Melanargia ganymedes Rühl, 1895 Tibet
Melanargia asiatica (Oberthür & Houlbert, 1922) China
Melanargia montana Leech, 1890 Yangtze
genus: Melanitis
Melanitis leda (Linnaeus, 1758)
M. l. leda (Linnaeus, 1758) China
M. l. ismene (Cramer, [1775]) Yunnan
Melanitis phedima (Cramer, [1780]) China
M. p. ganapati Fruhstorfer, 1908 Yunnan
Melanitis zitenius (Herbst, 1796) China
M. z. auletes Fruhstorfer, 1908
M. z. hainanensis Gu, 1994 Hainan
genus: Melitaea
Melitaea didyma (Esper, 1778) Northwest China
M. d. kirgisica Bryk, 1940 Tian Shan
Melitaea persea Kollar, [1850] Tian Shan
Melitaea didymoides Eversmann, 1847
M. d. didymoides Eversmann, 1847 Amur
M. d. latonia Grum-Grshimailo, 1891 Central China
M. d. pekinensis Seitz, [1909] North China
M. d. eupatides Fruhstorfer, 1917 Gansu
M. d. yugakuana Matsumura, 1927 Ussuri
Melitaea ala Staudinger, 1881
M. a. sheljuzhkoi Bryk, 1940 Tian Shan
M. a. determinata Bryk, 1940 Tian Shan
M. a. strandi Bryk, 1940 Tian Shan
Melitaea latonigena  Eversmann, 1847 
Melitaea fergana  Staudinger, 1882 
Melitaea asteroidea  Staudinger, 1881 
Melitaea sibina  Alphéraky, 1881 
Melitaea sutschana Staudinger, 1892
M. s. sutschana Staudinger, 1892 Northeast China Amur, Ussuri
Melitaea lunulata Staudinger, 1901 Tian Shan
Melitaea infernalis Grum-Grshimailo, 1891 Tian Shan
Melitaea yuenty Oberthür, 1886 West China
M. r. shanshiensis (Murayama, 1955) Shansi
Melitaea arduinna (Esper, 1783)
M. a. arduinna (Esper, 1783) Tian Shan
Melitaea agar Oberthür, 1886 Tibet
Melitaea cinxia (Linnaeus, 1758)
M. c. cinxia (Linnaeus, 1758) Amur
M. c. oasis Huang & Murayama, 1992 Xinjiang
Melitaea arcesia Bremer, 1861 North China, Central China
M. a. rucephala Fruhstorfer, 1915 Tian Shan
Melitaea sindura Moore, 1865 Tibet
Melitaea amoenula C. & R. Felder, [1867] Tibet
Melitaea jezabel Oberthür, 1886 Tibet
Melitaea bellona Leech, [1892] West China
Melitaea diamina (Lang, 1789) Northeast China
M. d. hebe (Borkhausen, 1793) Amur, Ussuri
Melitaea protomedia Ménétriés, 1859 Central China, East China
M. p. protomedia Ménétriés, 1859 Amur, Ussuri
M. p. regama Fruhstorfer, 1915 Southwest China
Melitaea minerva Staudinger, 1881 Tian Shan
Melitaea pallas Staudinger, 1886 Tian Shan
Melitaea rebeli  Wnukowsky, 1929 
Melitaea solona Alphéraky, 1881 Tian Shan
Melitaea sultanensis Staudinger, 1886 Tian Shan
Melitaea phoebe (Goeze, [1779])
M. p. mandarina Seitz, [1909] Amur
M. p. wagneri Wnukowsky, 1929 Tian Shan
Melitaea scotosia Butler, 1878 Northeast China
Melitaea romanovi Grum-Grshimailo, 1891
M. r. romanovi Grum-Grshimailo, 1891 North China
M. r. shanshiensis (Murayama, 1955) Shansi
Melitaea athalia (Rottemburg, 1775)
M. a. baikalensis Bremer, 1861 Amur
Melitaea ambigua Ménétriés, 1859
M. a. ambigua Ménétriés, 1859 Amur
M. a. niphona Butler, 1878 Ussuri
Melitaea aurelia Nickerl, 1850
M. a. distans Higgins, 1955Tien-Shan
Melitaea britomartis Assmann, 1847
M. b. amurensis Staudinger, 1892 Amur
M. b. latefascia Fixsen, 1887 Northeast China, Ussuri
Melitaea plotina Bremer, 1861
M. p. plotina Bremer, 1861 Amur, Ussuri
genus: Mimathyma
Mimathyma schrenckii (Ménétriés, 1859) Northeast China
M. s. laeta (Oberthür, 1906) Yunnan
Mimathyma nycteis (Ménétriés, 1858) Northeast China, Amur
Mimathyma chevana (Moore, [1866])
M. c. leechi Moore Central China, West China
Mimathyma ambica (Kollar, [1844])
M. a. miranda (Fruhstorfer, 1902) Yunnan
genus: Minois
Minois dryas (Scopoli, 1763)
M. d. bipunctatus (Motschulsky, 1861) Ussuri
Minois paupera (Alphéraky, 1888) West China, Tibet
Minois aurata (Oberthür, 1909) West China
Minois nagasawae (Matsumura)
genus: Moduza
Moduza procris (Cramer, [1777])
M. p. procris (Cramer, [1777]) South China
genus: Mycalesis
Mycalesis francisca (Stoll, [1780])
M. f. sanatana Moore, [1858] Yunnan
M. f. albofasciata Tytler, 1914 Yunnan
Mycalesis gotama Moore, 1857 China
M. g. charaka Moore, [1875] South China
Mycalesis perseus (Fabricius, 1775)
M. p. perseus (Fabricius, 1775) China
Mycalesis mineus (Linnaeus, 1758) China
M. m. subfasciata (Moore, 1882) Yunnan
Mycalesis perseoides (Moore, [1892]) Yunnan
Mycalesis intermedia (Moore, [1892]) Yunnan
Mycalesis suaveolens Wood-Mason & de Nicéville, 1883
M. s. konglua Tytler, 1939 Yunnan
Mycalesis misenus de Nicéville, 1889 West China
Mycalesis mamerta (Stoll, [1780])
M. m. mamerta (Stoll, [1780]) China
Mycalesis malsara Moore, 1857 Yunnan
Mycalesis anaxias (W. H. Evans, 1920)
Mycalesis unica Leech, [1892]
Mycalesis lepcha (Moore, 1880)
Mycalesis panthaka Fruhstorfer, 1909
Mycalesis sangaica Butler, 1877
genus: Neope
Neope armandii (Oberthür, 1876)
N. a. fusca Leech, 1891 West China
Neope pulaha (Moore, [1858])
N. p. pulaha (Moore, [1858]) Xizang, Tibet
N. p. emeinsis Huang, 2003 Sichuan
N. p. nuae Huang, 2002 Yunnan
Neope ramosa Leech, 1890 Sichuan, Hubei, Zhejiang, Henan, Fujian
Neope pulahoides (Moore, [1892])
N. p. pulahoides (Moore, [1892])Yunnan
N. p. chuni Mell, 1923 Fujian, Guangdong
N. p. leechi Okano & Okano, 1984 Sichuan
Neope simulans Leech, 1891 Tibet, Yunnan
Neope dejeani Oberthür, 1894 China, Tibet
Neope christi Oberthür, 1886 West China
N. c. dali Li, 1994 Yunnan
Neope bremeri (C. & R. Felder, 1862) West China
Neope goschkevitschii (Ménétriés, 1857)
Neope oberthueri Leech, 1891 West China, Yunnan
Neope agrestis (Oberthür, 1876) West China
Neope muirheadii (C. & R. Felder, 1862) West China, Central China
Neope pulahina (Evans, 1923) Tibet
Neope serica (Leech, 1892) West China
Neope bhadra (Moore, 1857) Guangxi
Neope lacticolora (Fruhstorfer, 1908)
Neope christi Oberthur 1886
Neope yama (Moore, [1858])
Neope shirozui  Koiwaya, 1989 
Neope contrasta
Neope chayuensis Huang,2002  
genus: Neorina
Neorina patria (Leech, 1891)
Neorina hilda  Westwood, [1850] 
Neorina neosinica  Lee, 1985 
genus: Neptis
Neptis harita Moore, [1875]
N. h. harita Moore, [1875] Yunnan
Neptis miah Moore, 1857
N. m. disopa Swinhoe, 1893 Sichuan
Neptis noyala Oberthür, 1906
N. n. noyala Oberthür, 1906 West China
N. n. qionga Gu & Wang, 1994 Hainan
Neptis sangangi Huang, 2001
Neptis sappho (Pallas, 1771)
Neptis hylas (Linnaeus, 1758)
N. h. hylas (Linnaeus, 1758) West China, Southeast China, Hainan, Hong Kong
N. h. kamarupa Moore, [1875] Yunnan
N. h. hainana Moore, 1878 Hainan
Neptis clinia Moore, 1872
N. c. susruta Moore, 1872 South China
N. c. tibetana Moore, 1899 West China
Neptis nata Moore, [1858]
N. n. adipala Moore, 1872 Yunnan, South China, Hainan
N. n. candida Joicey & Talbot, 1922 Hainan
Neptis capnodes Fruhstorfer, 1908
N. c. capnodes Fruhstorfer, 1908 West China
N. c. pandoces Eliot, 1969 Yunnan
Neptis choui Yuan & Wang, 1994 Shaanxi
Neptis soma Moore, 1858
N. s. shania Evans, 1924 Southwest China
Neptis mahendra Moore, 1872
N. m. extensa Leech, [1892] Sichuan
N. m. ursula Eliot, 1969 Yunnan
N. m. xizangensis Wang & Wang, 1994 Tibet
N. m. dulongensis Huang, 2002 Yunnan
Neptis leucoporos Fruhstorfer, 1908
N. l. leucoporos Fruhstorfer, 1908 South China, Hainan
Neptis clinioides de Nicéville, 1894
N. c. yaana Wang, 1994 Sichuan
Neptis sankara (Kollar, [1844])
N. s. antonia Oberthür, 1876 West China
N. s. guiltoides Tytler, 1940 Yunnan
N. s. xishuanbannaensis Yoshino, 1997 Yunnan
Neptis philyra Ménétriés, 1859
N. p. excellens Butler, 1878 Japan, Southeast China
N. p. melior Hall, 1930 Yunnan
Neptis zaida Doubleday, [1848]
N. z. thawgawa Tytler, 1940 Yunnan
Neptis radha Moore, 1857
N. r. sinensis Oberthür, 1906 Szechwan
Neptis narayana Moore, 1858
N. n. sylvia Oberthür, 1906 Szechwan
N. n. dubernardi Eliot, 1969 Yunnan
Neptis ananta Moore, 1858
N. a. chinensis Leech, [1892] West China
N. a. minus Yoshino, 1997 Fujian
Neptis nashona Swinhoe, 1896
N. n. patricia Oberthür, 1906 West China
N. n. chapa Eliot, 1969 Cochin China
Neptis nycteus de Nicéville, 1890 Tibet
Neptis manasa Moore, [1858]
N. m. manasa Moore, [1858] Central China, Yunnan
N. m. antigone Leech, 1890 Hubei, East China
N. m. narcissina Oberthür, 1906 Yunnan
N. m. tsangae Huang, 1998 Tibet
N. m. shinkaii Koiwaya, 1996 Tibet
Neptis philyroides Staudinger, 1887
N. p. philyroides Staudinger, 1887 East China, Amur, Ussuri
N. p. simingshana Murayama, 1980 Zhejiang
N. p. maotai Yoshino, 1997 Guizhou
Neptis nemorum Oberthür, 1906
N. n. nemorum Oberthür, 1906 Yunnan
Neptis rivularis (Scopoli, 1763)
N. r. ludmilla (Nordmann, 1851) Tian Shan
N. r. magnata Heyne, [1895] Amur, Ussuri
N. r. sinta Eliot, 1969 Szechwan
Neptis hesione Leech, 1890
N. h. hesione Leech, 1890 West China, Central China
Neptis pryeri Butler, 1871
N. p. pryeri Butler, 1871 Southeast China
N. p. arboretorum (Oberthür, 1876) China
Neptis andetria Fruhstorfer, 1913
N. a. andetria Fruhstorfer, 1913 Hunan, Shaansi
N. a. oberthueri Eliot, 1969 West China, Sichuan, Shaansi
Neptis namba Tytler, 1915
N. n. namba Tytler, 1915 China, Yunnan
N. n. leechi Eliot, 1969 West China
Neptis pseudonamba Huang, 2001 Tibet
Neptis theodora Oberthür, 1906
N. t. theodora Oberthür, 1906 Yunnan
Neptis cartica Moore, 1872
N. c. pagoda Yoshino, 1997 Yunnan
Neptis sinocartica Chou & Wang, 1994 Guangxi
Neptis armandia (Oberthür, 1876)
N. a. armandia (Oberthür, 1876) West China, Central China
N. a. manardia Eliot, 1969 Yunnan
Neptis cydippe Leech, 1890
N. c. cydippe Leech, 1890 West China, Central China
N. c. yongfui Huang, 2002 Yunnan
Neptis thestias Leech, [1892] West China
Neptis speyeri Staudinger, 1887 Southeast China, Amur, Ussuri
N. s. genulfa Oberthür, 1908 Yunnan
N. s. chuang Yoshino, 1997 Guanxi
Neptis sylvana Oberthür, 1906 Yunnan
Neptis antilope Leech, 1890 Central China, West China, South China
N. a. wuhaii Huang, 2002 Yunnan
Neptis meloria Oberthür, 1906 Central China, West China
Neptis guia Chou & Wang, 1994 Guangxi, Hainan
Neptis arachne Leech, 1890
N. a. arachne Leech, 1890 Central China, West China
N. a. giddeneme Oberthür, 1891 Yunnan
Neptis thetis Leech, 1890
N. t. thetis Leech, 1890 Hubei, Sichuan, Shaanxi
N. t. tibetothetis Huang, 1998 Tibet
N. t. pumi Yoshino, 1998 Yunnan
Neptis nemorosa Oberthür, 1906
N. n. nemorosa Oberthür, 1906 Sichuan
N. n. diqingensis Yoshino, 1999 Yunnan
Neptis alwina Bremer & Grey, [1852]
N. a. alwina Bremer & Grey, [1852] Northeast China, Amur, Ussuri
Neptis dejeani Oberthür, 1894 West China Southwest China
Neptis beroe Leech, 1890 Central China, West China
Neptis divisa Oberthür, 1908 Yunnan
Neptis qianweiguoi Huang, 2002 Yunnan
Neptis lixinghei Huang, 2002
Neptis yerburii  Butler, 1886 
Neptis reducta  Fruhstorfer, 1908 
Neptis taiwana  Fruhstorfer, 1908 
Neptis kuangtungensis  Mell, 1923 
genus: Ninguta
Ninguta schrenckii (Ménétriés, 1859) East China, Amur, Ussuri
N. s. damontas (Fruhstorfer, 1909) Szechuan
N. s. kuatunensis (Mell, 1939) Fukien
genus: Nosea
Nosea hainanensis Koiwaya, 1993
genus: Nymphalis
Nymphalis xanthomelas (Esper, 1781) China
N. x. xanthomelas (Esper, 1781) Amur, Ussuri
Nymphalis urticae (Linnaeus, 1758)
N. u. eximia (Sheljuzhko, 1919) Amur, Ussuri
N. u. stoetzneri (Kleinschmidt, 1929) Szechuan
N. u. chinensis Leech, 1893
Nymphalis caschmirensis (Kollar, [1844])
N. c. nixa (Grum-Grshimailo, 1890) West China
Nymphalis ladakensis (Moore, 1878) Tibet
Nymphalis antiopa (Linnaeus, 1758)
N. a. yedanula (Fruhstorfer, 1909) Sichuan
Nymphalis io (Linnaeus, 1758)
Nymphalis c-aureum (Linnaeus, 1758)
Nymphalis egea (Cramer, [1775])
N. e. undina (Grum-Grshimailo, 1890) Tian Shan
Nymphalis gigantea (Leech, 1890) Central China, Tibet
Nymphalis c-album (Linnaeus, 1758)
N. c. extensa (Leech, [1892]) West China, Central China
N. c. hamigera (Butler, 1877) Ussuri
Nymphalis interposita (Staudinger, 1881)
N. i. tibetana (Elwes, 1888) Northwest China
Nymphalis canace (Linnaeus, 1763)
N. c. canace (Linnaeus, 1763) South China, Hong Kong
N. c. charonides (Stichel, [1908]) Ussuri
Nymphalis extensa gongga S.Y. Lang, 2010  Sichuan
genus: Oeneis
Oeneis magna Graeser, 1888 North China
Oeneis hora Grum-Grshimailo, 1888 Tian Shan
Oeneis sculda (Eversmann, 1851)
O. s. pumila Staudinger, 1892 Northeast China
Oeneis nanna (Ménétriés, 1859)
O. n. nanna (Ménétriés, 1859) Northeast China, Amur
Oeneis jutta  (Hübner, [1806-1806]) 
Oeneis urda (Eversmann, 1847)
O. u. urda (Eversmann, 1847) Northeast China
Oeneis mongolica (Oberthür, 1876)
O. m. hoenei Gross, 1970 Shanxi
Oeneis tarpeia (Pallas, 1771)
O. t. tarpeia (Pallas, 1771) Northwest China
Oeneis buddha Grum-Grshimailo, 1891
O. b. buddha Grum-Grshimailo, 1891 Qinhai Lake, Qilian Shan, Xining, Sichuan
O. b. dejeani O. Bang-Haas, 1939 Gongga Shan
O. b. grieshuberi Lukhtanov & Eitschberger, 2000 Gansu (Qilian Shan)
O. b. kincli Kocman, 1994 Qinghai
O. b. frankenbachi Lukhtanov & Eitschberger, 2000 Qinghai (Kunlun Shan)
O. b. pygmea Gross, 1970 Sichuan,Tibet
O. b. brahma O. Bang-Haas, 1913 Tibet
Oeneis norna  Thunberg (1791)
genus: Orinoma
Orinoma alba Chou & Li, 1994 Yunnan
Orinoma damaris Gray, 1846
genus: Orsotriaena
Orsotriaena medus (Fabricius, 1775)
genus: Palaeonympha
Palaeonympha opalina Butler, 1871
genus: Pantoporia
Pantoporia assamica (Moore, 1881) South Yunnan
Pantoporia aurelia  (Staudinger, 1886) 
Pantoporia bieti (Oberthür, 1894)
P. b. bieti (Oberthür, 1894) Central China, West China
P. b. lixingguoi Huang, 2002 Yunnan
Pantoporia dindinga  (Butler, 1879) 
Pantoporia hordonia (Stoll, [1790])
P. h. hordonia (Stoll, [1790]) South Yunnan
P. h. rihodona (Moore, 1878) Hainan
Pantoporia sandaka (Butler, 1892)
P. s. davidsoni Eliot, 1969 Hainan
Pantoporia paraka (Butler, 1879)
P. p. paraka (Butler, 1879) Hainan
genus: Paralasa
Paralasa jordana (Staudinger, 1882)
P. j. helios (Bang-Haas, 1927) Tian-Shan
Paralasa kusnezovi (Avinoff, 1910) Tian-Shan
Paralasa styx (Bang-Haas, 1927) Tian-Shan
Paralasa herse (Grum-Grshimailo, 1891) West China, Tibet
Paralasa discalis South Tibet
Paralasa batanga Goltz, 1939 Yunnan
genus: Parantica
Parantica aglea (Stoll, [1782])
Parantica sita (Kollar, [1844]) China, Tibet
P. s. sita (Kollar, [1844]) Yunnan
Parantica pedonga Fujioka, 1970 Tibet
Parantica melaneus (Cramer, [1775])
P. m. melaneus (Cramer, [1775]) South China
genus: Parasarpa
Parasarpa dudu (Doubleday, [1848])
P. d. dudu (Doubleday, [1848]) Yunnan
P. d. jinamitra (Fruhstorfer, 1908) Taiwan
P. d. hainensis (Joicey & Talbot, 1921) Hainan
Parasarpa albomaculata (Leech, 1891) West China, Tibet
Parasarpa albidior (Hall, 1930) Yunnan
Parasarpa houlberti (Oberthür, 1913) Yunnan
Parasarpa zayla (Doubleday, [1848]) Yunnan
genus: Paroeneis
Paroeneis pumilus (C. & R. Felder, [1867]) Tibet
Paroeneis bicolor (Seitz, [1909]) Tibet
Paroeneis sikkimensis (Staudinger, 1889) Tibet
Paroeneis palaearcticus (Staudinger, 1889)
P. p. palaearcticus (Staudinger, 1889) West China, Tibet
P. p. nanschanicus (Grum-Grshimailo, 1902) Qinghai, Gansu, Qilianshan
P. p. buddha O. Bang-Haas, 1927 Qinghai, Gansu, Qilianshan
P. p. iole (Leech, [1892]) Sichuan, Kangding
P. p. atuntsensis (Gross, 1958) Yunnan
P. p. auloceroides Huang, 1999 Tibet
Paroeneis grandis  Riley, 1923  Tibet
Paroeneis parapumilus   Huang, 2001 
genus: Parthenos
Parthenos sylvia (Cramer, [1776])
P. s. gambrisius (Fabricius, 1787) South Yunnan
genus: Patsuia Moore, [1898]
Patsuia sinensium (Oberthür, 1876)
P. s. sinensium (Oberthür, 1876) Sichuan
P. s. minor (Hall, 1930) Yunnan
P. s. sengei (Kotzsch, 1929) Gansu
P. s. cinereus (O. Bang-Haas, 1937) Gansu
P. s. fulvus (O. Bang-Haas, 1937) Gansu
genus: Penthema
Penthema adelma (C. & R. Felder, 1862)
Penthema darlisa Moore, 1878
P. d. pallida Li, 1994 Yunnan
Penthema formosanum Rothschild, 1898
Penthema lisarda (Doubleday, 1845)
P. l. bowringi Joicey & Talbot, 1921
P. l. michallati Janet, 1894 Hainan
genus: Phaedyma
Phaedyma aspasia (Leech, 1890)
P. a. aspasia (Leech, 1890) West China, Central China, Hunnan
Phaedyma chinga Eliot, 1969
P. c.chinga Eliot, 1969 Central China
P. c. shaanxiensis Wang, 1994 Shaanxi
Phaedyma columella (Cramer, [1780])
P. c. columella (Cramer, [1780]) South China, Hong Kong, Hainan
P. c. martabana (Moore, 1881) South Yunnan
genus: Phalanta
Phalanta phalantha (Drury, [1773])
P. p. phalantha (Cramer)
P. p. columbina (Cramer, [1779]) South China, Hainan, Taiwan
genus: Polyura
Polyura arja (C. Felder & R. Felder) 1867
Polyura athamas (Drury) 1773>
P. a. athamas (Drury) 1773 Sichuan, Yunnan, Hong Kong
Polyura dolon (Westwood, 1847)
P. d. carolus (Fruhstorfer, 1904) Tibet, Sichuan
Polyura eudamippus (Doubleday, 1843) Central China
P. e. rothschildi (Leech, 1893) West China
P. e. nigrobasalis (Lathy, 1898) Yunnan
P. e. whiteheadi (Crowley, 1900) Hainan
P. e. cupidinius (Fruhstorfer, 1914) Yunnan
P. e. kuangtungensis (Mell, 1923) Guangdong
P. e. splendens (Tytler, 1940) Yunnan
Polyura nepenthes (Grose-Smith, 1883)
P. n. nepenthes (Grose-Smith, 1883) South China, Hainan
P. n. kiangsiensis (Rousseau-Decelle, 1938) Kiangsi, Zhejiang
Polyura posidonius (Leech, 1891)
Polyura narcaeus (Hewitson, 1854)
P. n. menedemus (Oberthür, 1891) Ta-tsien-lou, Moenia, Yunnan
P. n. meghaduta (Fruhstorfer, 1908) Taiwan
P. n. aborica (Evans, 1924) Tibet
Polyura schreiber (Godart, [1824])
P. s. assamensis (Rothschild, 1899) Yunnan
genus: Proclossiana
Proclossiana eunomia (Esper, 1800)
P. e. acidalia (Boeber, 1809) Amur, Ussuri
genus: Prothoe
Prothoe franck (Godart, [1824])
genus: Pseudergolis
Pseudergolis wedah (Kollar, 1848)
P. w. wedah (Kollar, 1848) Yunnan
P. w. chinensis Fruhstorfer
genus: Pseudochazara
Pseudochazara hippolyte (Esper, 1783)
P. h. mercurius Staudinger, 1887 Tian-Shan
Pseudochazara baldiva (Moore, 1865) Tibet
genus: Ragadia
Ragadia crisilda Hewitson, 1862
Ragadia crisilda crisildina Joicey & Talbot, 1921 Hainan
Ragadia crisilda latifasciata Leech, 1891 West China
genus: Rhaphicera
Rhaphicera dumicola (Oberthür, 1876) West China
Rhaphicera moorei (Butler, 1867) West China, Tibet
Rhaphicera satricus Doubleday, 1849
genus: Rohana
Rohana parisatis (Westwood, 1850)
R. p. staurakius (Fruhstorfer, 1913) Hong Kong, Yunnan
R. p. hainana (Fruhstorfer) Hainan
Rohana nakula (Moore, [1858])
R. n. panna Yoshino, 1995 Yunnan
Rohana parvata  (Moore, 1857)
genus: Sasakia
Sasakia charonda (Hewitson, 1863)
S. c. coreana Leech, 1887 Central China, West China
S. c. yunnanensis Fruhstorfer Yunnan
Sasakia funebris (Leech, 1891)
S. f. funebris (Leech, 1891) West China
S. f. genestieri Oberthür Yunnan
Sasakia pulcherrima Chou & Li
genus: Satyrus
Satyrus ferula Fabricius, 1793
S. f. altaica Grum-Grshimailo, 1893 Tian-Shan
genus: Sephisa
Sephisa dichroa (Kollar, [1844]) Southeast China
Sephisa princeps (Fixsen, 1887) Northeast China, Amur
S. p. tamla Sugiyama, 1999 Yunnan
Sephisa chandra (Moore, [1858])
S. c. chandra (Moore, [1858]) West China
S. c. zhejiangana Tong, 1994 Zhejiang
Sephisa daimio Matsumura, 1910 Taiwan
genus: Sinonympha
Sinonympha avinoffi (Schaus, 1927) West China 
genus: Speyeria
Speyeria aglaja (Linnaeus, 1758)
S. a. gigasvitatha (Verity, 1935) Tian Shan
S. a. clavimacula (Matsumura, 1929) Ussuri
S. a. kenteana (Stichel, 1901) Ussuri
Speyeria clara (Blanchard, [1844]) Tibet
genus: Stibochiona
Stibochiona nicea (Gray, 1846)
S. n. nicea (Gray, 1846) West China
genus: Stichophthalma
Stichophthalma howqua (Westwood, 1851) North china, Central China, Formosa
S. h. formosana Fruhstorfer, 1908 Formosa
S. h. miyana Fruhstorfer, 1913 Canton
S. h. suffusa Leech, 1892 Sichuan, Fujian stat. rev. now full species
Stichophthalma louisa (Wood-Mason, 1877)
S. l. mathilda Janet, 1905 Yunnan
Stichophthalma sparta de Nicéville, 1894
S. s. gonshana Huang, 2003 Yunnan
Stichophthalma neumogeni Leech, [1892]
S. n. neumogeni Leech, [1892] Sichuan, Shaanxi, Fujian, Jiangxi, Zheijian stat. rev. now full species
S. n. le Joicey & Talbot, 1921 Hainan Island stat. rev. now full species
S. n. renqingduojiei Huang, 1998 Tibet
Stichophthalama fruhstorferi Rober,1903 Guangxi
Stichophthalma nourmahal (Westwood, 1851)
Stichophthalma camadeva (Westwood, 1848)
genus: Sumalia
Sumalia daraxa (Doubleday, [1848])
S. d. daraxa (Doubleday, [1848]) West China
genus: Symbrenthia
Symbrenthia brabira Moore, 1872
S. b. leoparda Chou & Li, 1994 South Yunnan
S. b. sinica Moore, 1899 West China
Symbrenthia doni Tytler, 1940 Tibet
Symbrenthia hippoclus (Cramer, [1779])
S. h. hippoclus (Cramer, [1779]) West China, Central China, South China
S. h. lucina (Stoll, [1780]) Yunnan
Symbrenthia hypselis (Godart, [1824])
S. h. hypselis (Godart, [1824]) West China
S. h. cotanda Moore, [1875] Yunnan
Symbrenthia lilaea (Hewitson, 1864)
S. l. lilaea (Hewitson, 1864) China
S. l. formosanus Fruhstorfer, 1908 Formosa
Symbrenthia viridilunulata Huang & Xue, 2004 Sichuan
Symbrenthia niphanda Moore, 1872
Symbrenthia silana  de Nicéville, 1885 
Symbrenthia sinoides  Hall, 1935 
genus: Tanaecia
Tanaecia lepidea (Butler, 1868)
T. l. cognata (Moore, [1897]) Yunnan
Tanaecia cocytus (Fabricius, 1787)
T. c. ambrysus (Fruhstorfer, 1913) Yunnan
Tanaecia julii (Lesson, 1837)
T. j. julii (Lesson, 1837) Yunnan
Tanaecia jahnu (Moore, [1858])
T. j. jahnides (Fruhstorfer, 1905) Yunnan
Tanaecia whiteheadi (Crowley, 1900)
T. w. whiteheadi (Crowley, 1900) Hainan
T. w. telchinioides (Mell, 1923) Guangdong
genus: Tatinga
Tatinga thibetana (Oberthür, 1876)
genus: Terinos
Terinos atlita (Fabricius, 1787)
T. a. guangxienisChou, 1994 Guangxi
genus: Thaumantis
Thaumantis diores Doubleday, 1845
T. d. diores Doubleday, 1845
Thaumantis hainana  Crowley 1900 
genus: Thauria
Thauria lathyi (Fruhstorfer, 1902)
genus: Timelaea
Timelaea maculata (Bremer & Grey, [1852] China
Timelaea aformis Chou, 1994 Hubei
Timelaea albescens (Oberthür, 1886)
Timelaea radiata Chou & Wang, 1994 Gansu
Timelaea nana Leech, 1893 West China
genus: Tirumala
Tirumala gautama (Moore, 1877)
T. g. gautama (Moore, 1877) Hainan
Tirumala limniace (Cramer, [1775])
T. l. limniace (Cramer, [1775]) South China, Hainan, Taiwan
Tirumala septentrionis (Butler, 1874)
T. s. septentrionis (Butler, 1874) West China, South China, Taiwan
Tirumala alba Chou & Gu, 1994 Hainan
genus: Triphysa
Triphysa albovenosa Erschoff, 1885 North China
Triphysa dohrnii  Zeller, 1850 
Triphysa nervosa  Motschulsky, 1866 
genus: Vagrans
Vagrans egista (Cramer, [1780])
V. e. sinha (Kollar, [1844]) South China, Hunnan
genus: Vanessa
Vanessa indica (Herbst, 1794)
V. i. indica (Herbst, 1794)
Vanessa cardui (Linnaeus, 1758)
genus: Vindula
Vindula erota (Fabricius, 1793)
V. e. erota (Fabricius, 1793) Yunnan
Vindula dejone (Erichson, 1834)
genus: Yoma
Yoma sabina (Cramer, [1780])
genus: Ypthima
Ypthima similis Elwes & Edwards, 1893
Y. s. similis Elwes & Edwards, 1893 Yunnan
Ypthima sobrina Elwes & Edwards, 1893 Yunnan
Ypthima savara Grose-Smith, 1887
Y. s. savara Grose-Smith, 1887 Yunnan
Ypthima sakra Moore, 1857
Y. s. austeni (Moore, 1893) Tibet
Y. s. nujiangensis Huang, 2001 Tibet
Y. s. leechi Forster, [1948] Sichuan
Ypthima methorina Oberthür, 1891 Kweichow, Ta-tsien-lo
Ypthima medusa Leech, [1892] Szechwan
Ypthima conjuncta Leech, 1891
Y. c. conjuncta Leech, 1891 Central China, West China
Y. c. monticola Uemura & Koiwaya, 2000 Yunnan
Ypthima microphthalma Forster, [1948] Yunnan
Ypthima tappana Matsumura, 1909
Y. t. continentalis Murayama, 1981 Yunnan, Sichuan
Ypthima baldus (Fabricius, 1775)
Y. b. baldus (Fabricius, 1775) Yunnan
Y. b. luoi Huang, 1999 Yunnan
Y. b. hyampeia Fruhstorfer, 1911 Ussuri
Ypthima zodia Butler, 1871 Hainan
Ypthima lisandra (Cramer, [1780])
Y. l. lisandra (Cramer, [1780]) South China
Ypthima praenubila Leech, 1891
Y. p. praenubila Leech, 1891 Central China, West China
Ypthima huebneri Kirby, 1871 Yunnan
Ypthima chinensis Leech, 1892 Central China
Ypthima iris Leech, 1891
Y. i. iris Leech, 1891 Sichuan
Y. i. microiris Uémura & Koiwaya, 2000 Tibet
Y. i. paradromon Uémura & Koiwaya, 2000 Yunnan
Y. i. naqialoa Huang, 2003 Yunnan
Ypthima dromon Oberthür, 1891 Yunnan
Ypthima beautei Oberthür, 1884
Y. b. beautei Oberthür, 1884 West China
Y. b. qinghaiensis Huang & Wu, 2003 Qinghai
Ypthima pseudodromon Forster, [1948]Yunnan
Ypthima akbar Talbot, 1947 Yunnan
Ypthima insolita Leech, 1891 West China
Ypthima putamdui South, 1913 Sichuan
Ypthima frontierii Uémura & Monastyrskii, 2000 Guanxi
Ypthima yoshinobui Huang & Wu, 2003 Qinghai
Ypthima lihongxingi Huang & Wu, 2003 Hubei
Ypthima newara Moore, [1875]
Y. n. yaluzangbui Huang, 1999 Tibet
Ypthima dengae Huang, 2001 Tibet
Ypthima confusa Shirôzu & Shima, 1977 Yunnan
Ypthima muotuoensis Huang, 2000
Y. m. muotuoensis Huang, 2000 Tibet
Y. m. dulongae Huang, 2003 Yunnan
Ypthima pemakoi Huang, 1998 Tibet
Ypthima sinica Uémura & Koiwaya, 2000 East China, Sichuan
Ypthima tiani Huang & Liu, 2000
Y. t. tiani Huang & Liu, 2000 Sichuan
Y. t. nuae Huang, 2001 Yunnan
Ypthima motschulskyi (Bremer & Grey, 1853) East China, Hong Kong, Amur
Ypthima yangjiahei Huang, 2001 Yunnan
Ypthima multistriata Butler, 1883
Y. m. ganus Fruhstorfer, 1911 North China, Central China
Ypthima perfecta Leech, 1892
Y. p. perfecta Leech, 1892 Central China, West China
Ypthima sordida Elwes & Edwards, 1893 Yunnan, Shensi
Ypthima imitans Elwes & Edwards, 1893 Hainan
Ypthima phania (Oberthür, 1891) Yunnan
Ypthima ciris Leech, 1891
Y. c. ciris Leech, 1891 West China
Y. c. clinioides Oberthür, 1891 Yunnan
Ypthima albipuncta Lee, 1985 Yunnan
Ypthima parasakra Eliot, 1987
Y. p. menpae Huang, 1999 Tibet
Y. p. mabiloa Huang, 2003 Yunnan
Ypthima megalomma Butler, 1874
Ypthima nareda (Kollar, [1844])
Ypthima esakii Shirôzu, 1960
Ypthima nikaea Moore, [1875]
Ypthima formosana Fruhstorfer, 1908
Ypthima yamanakai Sonan, 1938
Ypthima zyzzomacula Chou & Li, 1994 Yunnan
Ypthima melli Forster 1948
Ypthima norma  (Westwood, 1851)
Ypthima akragas  Fruhstorfer, 1911
Ypthima argus  (Butler, 1866)
Ypthima uemuraiana  Huang,1999 
Ypthima pseudosakra  Huang,1999 
Ypthima angustipennis  Takahashi, 2000 
Ypthima wangi  Lee, 1998 
Ypthima wenlungi  M. Takáhashi, 2007  Taiwan
Ypthima eckweileri  Uémura & Koiwaya, 2001

References

Chou, I0 (ed) 1994. Monographia Rhopalocerorum Sinensium (Monograph of Chinese Butterflies). Henan Scientific and Technological Publishing House, Zhengzhou. (in Chinese). . Lists species plus new distribution records for China. New species descriptions are noted in English. Colour photographs of the species treated, with accompanying Chinese text.
Full list references

External links
Catalogue of life China List provided by Chinese Academy of Sciences online here
Butterflies of China at Digital moths of Japan. Includes images.
Wikispecies taxonomy additional references via species or genus
Acta Zootaxonomica Sinica

Lists of butterflies of China